Erendira Ikikunari is a 2006 drama film based on the story of Princess Eréndira.

Plot
The plot is based on a mixture of folk mythology and oral tradition. When the Spanish come to take over Tenochtitlan, Eréndira rallies her people in order to defeat them.

Home media
It was released on DVD on January 27, 2009. Special features include English subtitles. The Mexican version is 117 minutes long, while the American version is 107 minutes.

External links
 

2006 films
2006 drama films
Mexican historical drama films
Films about conquistadors
Films set in Mesoamerica
Indigenous cinema in Latin America
2000s Spanish-language films
Purépecha-language films
2000s Mexican films